Peter Quinn (17 February 1928 – 23 August 2008) was a Catholic bishop.

Ordained to the priesthood in 1950, Quinn served as auxiliary bishop of the Archdiocese of Perth, Australia from 1969 to 1982. He then served as bishop of the Roman Catholic Diocese of Bunbury, Australia from 1982 until 2000.

See also

Notes

1928 births
2008 deaths
Roman Catholic bishops of Bunbury
20th-century Roman Catholic bishops in Australia